Luis Kadijevic (1947 – 12 December 2021) was an Argentine footballer.

Club career
Kadijevic played for Almirante Brown and San Lorenzo in the Primera División Argentina. He played three seasons for Kalamata in the Greek Super League.

Personal
Kadijevic has a son, Maximiliano, and a grandson (Julian) who also are professional footballers.

Kadijevic died on 12 December 2021.

References

1947 births
2021 deaths
Argentine footballers
San Lorenzo de Almagro footballers
Defensores de Belgrano footballers
Kalamata F.C. players
Argentine Primera División players
Argentine expatriate footballers
Expatriate footballers in Greece
Club Almirante Brown footballers
Deportivo Armenio footballers
Association football goalkeepers